When in Love is the first single from MC Lyte's third album Act Like You Know. It was released on August 22, 1991. Although its original version of the album is produced by Wolf & Epic, its single version includes a remix made with Carmen Rizzo.

The song presents a style more oriented to the New Jack Swing sound.

In November 1991, the song peaked  14 on the Billboard's Hot R&B Singles, where it remained for 13 weeks, being her most successful song on that list to that date. Also peaking at  3 on the Billboard Hot Rap Singles.

Conception and composition 
According to Lyte in an Atlantic press release, the song is about "the stupid things people do when they're in love," describing situations like "I'm talkin like pickin your lover's nose/Cooking his food and washing his clothes/And if you thought that was goin too far/What about givin him the keys to your car?"

During an interview with Vibe in 2011 Lyte reflected on her music video: "When I was dancing in my video for ‘When In Love,’ I was just ready to try something different. I wasn't really concerned about any backlash. I did what I wanted to do."

Samples
The original version of the album contains an interpolation of Bill Withers's "The Same Love That Made Me Laugh" in his chorus. Carmen Rizzo's remix with Wolf & Epic, which was used in the music video, is built around a sample of James Brown 's "Hot (I Need to Be Loved, Loved, Loved)".

Appearances
"When in Love" was included in her compilation albums The Very Best of MC Lyte (2001), Rhyme Masters (2005), and Cold Rock a Party - Best Of MC Lyte (2019). Her music video was included on her compilation video album Lyte Years (1991).

In the fall of 1991 she performed the song at the Pay-per-view TV concert  Sisters In The Name of Rap. In February 1992 Lyte performed the song on the dance and music show Soul Train.

Critical reception
Gil Griffin of The Washington Post highlighted the song in his album review for his way of approaching obsessive love.

In hindsight, Damon Brown of RapReviews would criticize the song, commenting that "is too convoluted, especially when compared to Rakim’s “Mahogany” or even Ghostface Killah’s recent “Love Sessions."

In the book Icons of Hip Hop: An Encyclopedia of the Movement, Music, and Culture (2007), the writer Jennifer R. Young would comment on the song:

Single track listing

12" Vinyl

A-Side
 "When In Love" (Remix) (5:15)
 "When In Love" (Acapella) (3:50)

B-Side
 "When In Love" (Instrumental) (4:02)

Cassette

A-Side
	"When In Love" (Remix Edit)
	"When In Love" (Remix)

B-Side
	"When In Love" (Remix Edit)
	"When In Love" (Remix)

Personnel
Credits are taken from the liner notes.
Lyrics By – MC Lyte
Mastered By – Chris Gehringer (cg☮)
Mixed By – Carmen Rizzo
Music By – Bret Mazur, Richard Wolf
Producer – Wolf & Epic
Scratches – DJ K-Rock, DJ Master Tee

Charts

References 

MC Lyte songs
Songs written by Richard Wolf
Songs written by Epic Mazur
1991 singles
1991 songs
Atlantic Records singles
Songs written by MC Lyte